The Macau Grand Prix is a motorsport road race for automobiles and motorcycles held annually in Macau. It is the only street circuit racing event in which both cars and motorcycles participate, and one of only two current national Grand Prix events that are not part of the Formula One World Championship, the other being the New Zealand Grand Prix.

The first Macau Grand Prix event was held in 1954, as a sports car event. In 1961, the title race became an open-wheel Formula Libre event. The event has also had a variety of support races in its duration. Production cars joined the event in 1957, which were superseded by touring cars in 1972. The event received world championship status from 2005 to 2014 as the final round of the World Touring Car Championship. In 1976, the Macau Motorcycle Grand Prix was introduced. In 2008, a GT3 race was added to the event, which became known as the FIA GT World Cup.

The highlight of the race weekend is the Macau Formula Three Grand Prix, featuring many national Formula Three champions and drivers from around the world, with the winner being awarded the FIA Formula 3 World Cup. Many current or former Formula One drivers have participated in the event early in their careers and some of them have won the prestigious prize. Previous winners include Riccardo Patrese, Ayrton Senna, Michael Schumacher, David Coulthard, Ralf Schumacher, Ralph Firman, Takuma Sato, Lucas di Grassi, Edoardo Mortara, António Félix da Costa, Felix Rosenqvist and Dan Ticktum.

History
The Macau Grand Prix was originally conceived in 1954 as a treasure hunt around the streets of the city, but shortly after, it was suggested that the hunt's track could host a professional racing event for local motor enthusiasts.

The race continued as an amateur race until 1966, when Belgian driver Mauro Bianchi entered the race in an Alpine A220 (chassis #1722). Alpine Renault had also sent engineer Jean-Paul Castilleux to assist Bianchi with technical aspects of the car. Bianchi's victory and exposure led to more professional racing teams entering the Grand Prix in the following years.

The motorcycle race was introduced in 1967, and in that year the first fatal tragedy struck the race: double champion Dodjie Laurel was killed when he lost control of his car and crashed. This raised the alarm for more safety improvements for the race. Teddy Yip was one of the main forces behind the Macau Grand Prix back in the 1970s and 1980s, leading this Grand Prix to be one of the world's most famous motor racing events. The Macau Grand Prix parties he hosted for many years at his home also became a central part of the social aspect of the Grand Prix. Prize money at this time was not substantial, with 1980 winner Geoff Lees receiving thirty-four dollars and 1981 winner Bob Earl receiving thirty-six.

In 1983, it was decided by the organisers that since Formula Pacific was becoming obsolete, the race would be held as a Formula Three event. Initially, they wanted to run a F2 race, but as they were unwilling to make any large circuit modifications, which included cutting down trees, the organisers decided to adopt Formula 3 cars for the feature race and it was sanctioned by FIA as the F3 World Cup title race. At the same time, Yokohama Tire was officially designated as the sole supplier of control tires for the competitors.

This decision has seen the reputation of the event in the motorsport world increase rapidly, with the event attracting the best young drivers from Europe and Japan. The first F3 race was won by a young Ayrton Senna. The race in 1990 was a memorable one, as Michael Schumacher and Mika Häkkinen were involved in an incident when they were in first and second going into the final lap. At the main straight just after the Mandarin Oriental Bend, Häkkinen hit the back of Schumacher's car and crashed out when he attempted to overtake him. Schumacher's car was able to continue with its rear wing damaged and eventually won the race with the best aggregate time. Other notable winners include Formula One drivers David Coulthard, Ralf Schumacher and Takuma Sato. Since the introduction of F3 races, the Macau GP has gradually become a stepping stone for many F3 drivers to higher class motor-racing competitions such as the FIA Formula 2 Championship and Formula One.  However, only three drivers in the field in the 2010s -- Valtteri Bottas in 2011, Max Verstappen in 2014, and Charles Leclerc in 2015—who have started this race have won a Formula One race, and 1995 was the last time a Macau Grand Prix winner won a Formula One race.

Format

The Macau Grand Prix race weekend normally starts on the Thursday and ends on the Sunday on the second or third week of November. The first two days (Thursday and Friday) are generally scheduled for practice and qualifying. All races are held on Saturday and Sunday, with the final rounds of the heavyweights Macau Formula 3 Grand Prix and the Touring Car Guia Race (the final 2 rounds of the World Touring Car Championship), as well as the FIA GT World Cup, held on the last day. Both the Macau Formula 3 Grand Prix and the Guia Race are sanctioned by the FIA and the winner of the Macau Formula 3 Grand Prix is awarded the FIA World Cup. Apart from the two major races held at the race weekend, the Macau Motorcycle Grand Prix is also one of the highlights of the weekend since it features former or current racers of the Superbike World Championship and stars of Britain's legendary open-road motorcycle races such as the Isle of Man TT.

Newly introduced into the 2007 race Macau GT Cup is the race for GT3 category cars. Since 2015 the winner of the race is awarded the FIA GT World Cup.

Over the years, the Macau Grand Prix's Guia Race for touring cars had belonged to the Asian Touring Car Championship, and the current GT Cup race was once the Supercar Cup for road going exotic sports cars., the Formula Renault race, the Porsche Carrera Cup Asia race, the scooter race for locals and in the past but on a less than frequent basis, a Jackie Chan endorsed race for celebrity women drivers (partnered with pro racers) involving Mitsubishis, with whom Chan hold a sponsorship deal.

Major accidents 

1967: Arsenio Laurel: Killed when he lost control of his Lotus 41 and hit the corner sea wall, now called Mandarin Bend. He was trapped in his Formula car and burned.

1971: David Ma: whilst qualifying, he lost control of his Lotus 47 under braking for the Statue Corner, striking into a lamp post. Ma was killed instantly. The wrecked remains of his car was dumped at sea on its return trip.

1972: Chan Shui Fat: at the Guia Race, his Mini Cooper went out of control at more than 100 mph  and left the road. Chan jumped out of the car before it crashed into a wall and burst into flames. He died from internal bleeding shortly after being admitted to hospital.

1979: Tong Zheng Hui: at the ACP saloon car support race, Tong's Toyota Corolla coupe and Bobby Chung Datsun Sunny collided with each other and caught fire at Excelsior Bend, killing Tong and hospitalizing the other with serious injuries. The third driver involved, Wong Weng Kwong, was critically injured after crashing into barrier at the same place immediately before collision.

1974: Dieter Glemser: during practice for the Guia Race, he lost control of his Zakspeed Ford Escort RS 1600 when it suffered from a blowout. The car hit a sea wall, spun across the rain-soaked track and ploughed into the mostly unprotected crowd, consisting of several young spectators. One of them, an eight-year-old child, later died of his injuries and five children between 6 and 10 received hospital treatment. The accident led Glemser, the 1971 Guia Race winner, to retire from racing months later.

1998: At the Supercar Cup (the predecessor of GT World Cup), a Ferrari 348 caught fire due to an oil leak, this almost spread to the Ferrari of Aaron Kwok, causing him to park up and bail out. The driver parked the burning car in the pits with two firefighters trying to extinguish the fire. A Porsche 911T lost control spun out of control after hitting the oil slick, striking into two firemen and three track officials, before crashing into a barrier, destroying the car frontally. The fireman later died from his injuries.

: Frans Verschuur: during the warm-up session for the Guia touring car race, his Renault Megane suffered a brake failure as he entered Lisboa. The car ploughed into several tyre barriers before hitting a parked car and then continued on before hitting a truck, killing a pedestrian (a tourist who was not part of the event), injuring three others and while Verschuur suffered back and leg injuries. The incident led to his team, Renault Dealer Team Holland, to pull out of the race as a mark of respect.

2012: : In a WTCC-spec Chevrolet Cruze in the CTM Touring Car Cup invitational, a part failure led to the car making contact with the Turn 2 (Mandarin Oriental) wall at speeds over 200 km/h.  The rescue team tried to put out the fire with the fire extinguisher.  The driver was airlifted to the hospital, but died shortly afterwards.

2018: Sophia Flörsch: Suffered a spinal fracture after her Formula 3 car became airborne after contact leading into Lisboa corner, flipping over the catch fencing and striking a photographers' bunker.

Motorcycle fatalities: 
 Shea Lun Tsang 1973
 Lam Sai-Kwan 1977
 Chan Wai Chi 1983
 Zoe Maximo Rosario 1993
 Tung Sai-Wing 1993
 Katsuhiro Tottori 1994
 Bruno Bonhuil 2005
 Luis Carreira 2012
 Daniel Hegarty 2017

Circuit

The 3.8 miles (6.2 km) Guia Circuit features a combination of fast straights and tight corners, with the circuit's minimum width being only seven metres. It is recognised as one of the most challenging circuits in the world.

Title race

The first title race was held in 1954 as a sports car race. In 1961 the title race switched to the Formula Libre till 1974, when Formula Pacific came into play. 1983 was a start of the new era with the introduction of the Formula 3 rules, which attracted drivers from European Formula 3 championships and the Japanese Formula 3 Championship. 2019 introduced the Dallara F3 2019 machinery, with the entrants—all of them from the FIA Formula 3 Championship—using equal cars and engines for the first time.

In 2020 and 2021, the title race was run as a part of the 2020 China Formula 4 Championship and 2021 China Formula 4 Championship with exclusively local drivers and teams, as the COVID-19 pandemic forced travel restrictions on international FIA F3 drivers and teams.

Touring cars

The first Guia race for touring cars was held in 1972. The event was notable in that very few touring car races were held on street circuits at the time. From 2005 to 2014, the race became the final two rounds of the FIA World Touring Car Championship. In 2015, the category was replaced by the TCR International Series with Robert Huff winning both the last WTCC and first TCR races at the circuit. Huff has won a record eight races at the circuit.

Motorcycles

Macau is a special event for motorcycle riders. The Motorcycle Grand Prix has featured notable top-level riders, with winners of the race including MotoGP World Champion Kevin Schwantz, Superbike World Champion Carl Fogarty, notable MotoGP rider Ron Haslam and Isle of Man legends Michael Rutter, Michael Dunlop, and John McGuinness.  Because of the street circuit nature, the course is closer to the legendary British open-road races than a regulation MotoGP circuit.

In 2014, the award-winning documentary Macau Gladiators by German director Andreas Knuffmann appeared. The movie is about the 2013 edition of the Motorcycle Grand Prix and followed the Team of Frank Heidger with the German Didier Grams (8th place) and his Belgian teammate Marc Fistette (DNF).

Winners

GT Cup
The FIA GT World Cup is a race for GT3-spec cars, organized by the Stéphane Ratel Organisation (SRO) and the Automobile General Association Macau-China (AAMC). The event was confirmed by the FIA at the World Motor Sport Council in Geneva on 20 March 2015. The winning driver of the event is the winning driver of the Main Race, but the award for the FIA GT World Cup for Manufacturers is presented to the manufacturer supplying the cars with a manufacturer entry with the highest number of points after addition of the points of its two best cars awarded according to the result of the Main Race.

Starting in 2017, there is an age limit for drivers;  drivers may be no older than 59 years 364 days, as bronze-level drivers are prohibited from participation.  (Under FIA driver grading rules, any driver over 60 is a bronze driver, regardless of his accomplishments).

Winners

See also
 Guia Circuit
 Grand Prix Museum, opened during the 40th Macau Grand Prix in 1993
 World Touring Car Championship

References

Notes

External links

FIA Formula 3 Intercontinental Cup
Asian Festival of Speed results

 
Formula Three races
1954 establishments in Macau